Vennira Aadai Nirmala (born as A. B. Shanthi in Kumbakonam) is an Indian actress who has appeared in Tamil, Malayalam and Telugu films. She was a prominent lead actress from 1960s and 70s. She is credited as Ushakumari in Malayalam film industry.

Personal life
She was born as Shanthi to Aranmanai L Balakrishnan and Rukmani at Kumbakonam. She had four siblings. She remains unmarried.

Acting career 

Debuting through C. V. Sridhar's Vennira Aadai in 1965, she has acted as lead roles in over 400+ films encompassing four languages - Tamil, Malayalam, Telugu & Kannada. Her screen name in Malayalam films was 'Usha Kumari' In addition to her acting career, Nirmala is a trained Bharatanatyam dancer. She acted in the TV series - Deivamagal.

Political career 

M. G. Ramachandran had adopted her as his sister and wanted to be his heir in politics. But she refused. MGR had nominated her to the Tamil Nadu Legislative Council. Her swearing in ceremony was scheduled for 23 April 1986. Nirmala had earlier declared insolvency and according to Article 102-(1)(c) of the Indian Constitution, an insolvent person can not serve as a member of parliament or state legislature.

This annulment made Nirmala's nomination valid and the writ petition against it was dismissed. However, Nirmala withdrew her nomination to the council. Miffed with this incident, MGR decided to abolish the council.

Partial filmography
This list is incomplete; you can help by expanding it.

Tamil

Vennira Aadai (1965)
Ennathan Mudivu (1965)
  Kadhalithal mattum Podhuma (1967)
 Bhakta Prahlada (1967)
 Lakshmi Kalyanam (1968)
 Chakkaram (1968)
 Ragasiya Police 115 (1968)
 Muthu Chippi (1968)
 Kuzhanthaikkaga (1968)
 Poova Thalaiya (1969)
 Mannippu (1969)
 Annaiyum Pithavum (1969)
 Kanni Penn (1969)
 Thanga Surangam (1969)
 Thunaivan (1969)
 Enga Mama (1970)
 Veettuku Veedu (1970)
 Kannan Varuvan (1970)
 Noorandu Kalam Vazhga (1970)
 Sangamam (1970)
 Yaen? (1970)
 Vairakiyam (1970)
 Namma Kuzhandaigal (1970)
 Babu (1971)
 Thangaikkaaga (1971)
 Deivam Pesuma (1971)
 Aathi Parasakthi (1971)
 Anbukkor Annan (1971)
 Needhi Dhevan (1971)
 Sudarum Sooravaliyum (1971)
 Thanga Gopuram (1971)
 Veguli Penn (1971)
 Aval (1972)
 Bathilukku Bathil (1972)
 Thaikku Oru Pillai (1972)
 Anbu Sagodharargal (1973)
 Engal Thaai (1973)
 Pookaari (1973)
 Prarthanai (1973)
 Vakkuruthi (1973)
 Nyayam Ketkirom (1973)
 Veettukku Vandha Marumagal (1973)
 Nalla Mudivu (1973)
 Avalukku Nigar Avale (1974)
 Pathu Madha Bandham (1974)
 Samayalkaran (1974)
 Sisubalan (1974)
 Ingeyum Manidhargal (1975)
 Naalai Namadhe (1975)
 Eduppar Kai Pillai (1975)
 Idhayakkani (1975)
 Oorukku Uzhaippavan (1976)
 Unakkaga Naan (1976)
 Janaki Sabadham (1976)
 Ellam Avale (1977)
 Indru Pol Endrum Vaazhga (1977)
 Maamiyar Veedu (1977)
 Meenava Nanban (1977)
 Kaviraja Kalamegam (1978)
 Karunamoorthi (1978)
 Gnana Kuzhandhai (1979)
 Nadagame Ulagam (1979)
 Velli Ratham (1979)
 Kaali (1980)
 Guru (1980)
 Kallukkul Eeram (1980)
 Deiva Thirumanangal-Meenakshi Kalyanam (1981)
 Deiva Thirumanangal-Srinivasa Kalyanam (1981)
 Bala Nagamma (1981)
 Nadodi Raja (1982)
 Arunachalam (1997)
 Vaimaye Vellum (1997)
 Thaalikaatha Kaaliamman (2001)
  Kaamaraasu  (2002)
 Periyar (2007)

Malayalam: Credited as Ushakumari

 Sharjah To Sharjah (2001)
 Poomarathanalil (1997)
 Kilungaatha Changalakal (1981)
 Kaanthavalayam (1980)
 Bhakthahanuman (1980)
 Ashwaradham(1980) as Lakshmi
 Iniyum Kaanaam (1979) as Nirmala
 Veerabhadran (1979)
 Randil Onnu (1978)
 Chakraayudham (1978)
 Velluvili (1978) as Savithri
 Hemantharaathri (1978)
 Thacholi Ambu (1978)
 Guruvayoor Keshavan (1977)
 Sreemurukan (1977)
 Amba Ambika Ambaalika (1976) as Sathyavathi
 Maanishaada (1975)
 Thomasleeha (1975)
 Njaan Ninne Premikkunnu (1975) as Gracy
 Suprabhaatham (1974)
 Durga (1974)
 Paavangal Pennungal (1973)
 Aashaachakram (1973)
 Shaasthram Jayichu Manushyan Thottu (1973) as Suvarna
 Thaniniram (1973)
 Thenaruvi (1973) as Thulasi
 Jesus (1973) as Mary Magdalna
 Maravil Thirivu Sookshikkuka (1972) as Maalu
 Lora Nee Evide (1971) as Lora
 Panchavankaadu (1971) as Devamma
 Dathuputhran (1970) as Omana
 Bheekara Nimishangal (1970) as Indira
 Cross Belt (1970) as Leela/Mrs.Robert
 Vivaahitha (1970) as Leela
 Janmabhoomi (1969) as Madhavi
 Koottukudumbam (1969) as Radhika
 Vilakkappetta Bandhangal (1969)
  Punnapura Vayalar (1968) as Chinnamma
 Yakshi (1968) as Vijayalakshmi
 Sahadharmini (1967)
 Maadatharuvi (1967)
 Thalirukal (1967)
 NGO (1967) as Shantha
 Sheelavathi (1967) as Saraswathi
 Iruttinte Athmavu (1967) as Prema
 Ramanan (1967) as Karthi
 Jeevikkaan Anuvadikkoo (1967)
Kayamkulam Kochunni (1966) as Nabeesa
 Station Master (1966) as Geetha & Omana
 Kallippennu (1966) as Kallippennu
 Chettathi (1965) as Susheela
 Kaattuthulasi (1965) as Thulasi

Telugu

 Bhakta Prahlada (1967)
 Ave Kallu (1967)
 Mooga Nomu (1969)
 Bangaru Talli (1971)
 Bomma Borusa (1971)
 Kathula Rathaiah (1972)
  Datta Putrudu  (1972)
 Devude Gelichadu (1976)
  Karunamayudu (1978) 
 Sri Anjaneya Charitra (1981)
 Bala Nagamma (1981)
 Sri Sita Ramula Kalyanam Chootamu Raarandi (1998)
 Adhipathi (2001)
 Kalisundam Raa (2000)
 Jayam Manadera (2000)
 Ninne Premistha (2000)
 Seema Simham (2002)
 Okariki Okaru (2003)
 Arjun (2004)
 Shankar Dada M.B.B.S. (2004)
 Shankar Dada Zindabad (2007)
 Ragada (2010)

Kannada
 Sri Renukadevi Mahathme (1975)
 Kari Naga (1985)

Television serials

Awards and honours
2009; Kaviarasu Kannadasan Tamizh Sangam Award

References

Actresses in Malayalam cinema
Living people
Indian film actresses
Actresses in Tamil cinema
People from Thanjavur district
Year of birth missing (living people)
Indian television actresses
Actresses in Tamil television
Actresses from Tamil Nadu
20th-century Indian actresses
21st-century Indian actresses
All India Anna Dravida Munnetra Kazhagam politicians
Actresses in Telugu cinema
Actresses in Kannada cinema